The  is a food court which opened in 1994, located in the Shin-Yokohama district of Kōhoku-ku, Yokohama, Japan.

The "museum" , or rather, food court, is devoted to the Japanese ramen noodle soup and features a small recreation of Tokyo in the year 1958, the year instant noodles were invented. Within the museum are branches of famous ramen restaurants from Kyushu to Hokkaido. The list includes Ide Shoten, Shinasobaya, Keyaki, Ryushanhai, Hachiya, Fukuchan, and Komurasaki. In 2013, the museum added American restaurant Ikemen Hollywood to their restaurants, and have since decided to close the branch in June 2014.

The museum is within walking distance of Shin-Yokohama Station and has a Shōwa-era theme.

See also

 CupNoodles Museum Yokohama
List of food and beverage museums
 Ramen street

References

External links

 Shin-Yokohama Ramen Museum, Tokyo Food Page

Restaurants in Japan
Ramen Museum
Food museums in Japan
Ramen shops
Museums established in 1994
1994 establishments in Japan